SMM-J2135-0102 (also known as the Cosmic Eyelash) is a galaxy discovered using the Large Apex Bolometer Camera (LABOCA) of the Atacama Pathfinder Experiment (APEX) telescope.

The object was discovered by a group of researchers during an observation session of the galaxy supercluster, MACSJ2135-010217. The cluster causes a gravitational lens effect that amplified SMM-J2135-0102 by 32 times. It was possible to identify four molecular clouds whose solar luminosities were 100 times higher than that of similar regions in the Milky Way. This suggests a process of star formation that is 250 times faster.

References 

Galaxies
Aquarius (constellation)